Overdrive is an arcade-style motor racing game which was written by Peter Johnson for the Acorn Electron and BBC Micro and released in 1984 by Superior Software.

Gameplay
The game was probably inspired by the hugely successful Namco/Atari arcade game Pole Position, one of the most popular arcade games of the era. It is also influenced by Sega's 1981 game Turbo. Like those arcade games, Overdrive uses the "rear-view racer format" but there are no bends in the track. The aim of the game is to finish in the top 12 in order to qualify for the next track. There are five different tracks but as there are no bends, the only difference is the change in scenery (fields, night, snow, desert and riverside scenes) as well as a change in the grip.

Points are awarded for the distance travelled as well as a bonus given at the end of each level depending on the number of computer-controlled cars that have been passed. If the player collides with another car, they explode and regenerate. This can happen an infinite number of times but it wastes time and many opponents will pass while the player slowly accelerates. It is also common for opponents to crash into the back of the player while they are still accelerating causing another explosion.

Reception
The game was hugely successful selling almost 40,000 copies across both BBC Micro and Electron versions which was exceptional for that platform. It was Superior Software's biggest seller, out-selling even the individual Repton titles. It was especially popular on the Acorn Electron (outselling the BBC version by a ratio of more than 2:1). This is probably down to the fact that it was the only 3D scrolling racing game available for the Electron for many years (with hardware limitations discouraging many conversions) while the BBC version had competition from more sophisticated simulations such as Revs as well as the official Atarisoft port of Pole Position.

Legacy
Overdrive remained the only 3D racing game available for the Electron until 1987 when Superior released the motorbike racer Crazee Rider, a game originally conceived as a follow-up to Overdrive. This game did include bends showing that it would have been possible but the fact that it took so long for another such game to be released shows what a technical achievement converting Overdrive for the Electron had been. Also in 1987, Overdrive was included on the Superior Collection compilations (vol.2 on the BBC, vol.3 on the Electron), meaning it was still available until the demand for 8-bit games dried up in the early 1990s.

References

External links

1984 video games
BBC Micro and Acorn Electron games
BBC Micro and Acorn Electron-only games
Europe-exclusive video games
Racing video games
Superior Software games
Video games developed in the United Kingdom
Single-player video games